Sofare: his name is from Société de Fabrication de Rétrochargeurs or  Company Manufacturing  backhoe loaders  a subsidiary of the ENMTP, with a registered capital of 2 billion DZD specialized  in manufacturing backhoe loaders, Compaction Equipment, Stationary Compressors and Concrete injection pump.

Partnership
The SOFARE developed compactors of New Generation products through its subsidiary Europactor Algeria created as a joint venture, in partnership with the Spanish company Europactor Aaecomhel.

Products
The current line of products manufactured by the company includes:

Backhoe loaders
ENMTP 4120 S
ENMTP 4130
ENMTP 4140 B 2x4
ENMTP 4150 4x4

Compaction Equipment 
 Vibrating plates: BP 18
 Single drum compactors: SP 24 and SP 54
 Double drum compactor: DA 30

Stationary Compressors (Electric/Diesel) 
D 24
D 45
D 71 
D 103
E 28
E 92 
CE 93

Concrete pumps
 MI 25

and other small & medium constructions machines.

References

See also
Enmtp
Europactor Algeria

Economy of Constantine, Algeria
Companies established in 2011
Companies based in Constantine, Algeria
Algerian brands
ENMTP
2011 establishments in Algeria